Royal Artillery (RA) Park, a military installation in Halifax, Nova Scotia, Canada, forms part of Canadian Forces Base Halifax. It is home to the headquarters of 36 Canadian Brigade Group and the official residence of the Commander of the 5th Canadian Division.  On the grounds of RA Park are the oldest military officers' mess in Canada (1816) and the Cambridge Military Library, which houses one of the oldest library collections in the country (1810). Royal Artillery Park was initially funded from the conquest of present-day Maine, which was renamed the colony of New Ireland.

History 
In the far corner of the Royal Artillery Park, a diminutive red brick building, is the Cambridge Military Library. This building was the social and literary centre of military Halifax. The Library opened in 1817 at Grafton Street, as an alternative to the more notorious choices of city entertainment. It moved to its present location in Royal Artillery Park in 1886 and was renamed Cambridge Military Library in 1902. The library was funded in part from Customs receipts gathered during the War of 1812 at the Battle of Hampden.

Gallery

See also 
Military history of Nova Scotia
List of oldest buildings and structures in Halifax, Nova Scotia

References

Links 
History of Royal Artillery Park - Official site

Parks in Halifax, Nova Scotia
Military history of Nova Scotia